Milkovo ( or ) is the name of several rural localities in Russia:
Milkovo, Kamchatka Krai, a selo in Milkovsky District of Kamchatka Krai